Ever Iván Almeida Romero (born 22 January 1978) is a Paraguayan football manager and former player who played as a goalkeeper.

Career
Almeida was born in Asunción, and notably represented Olimpia and Sportivo Patria during his playing career. After retiring, he started working as an assistant coach of his father at the Guatemala national team and Olimpia.

On 22 April 2014, Almeida was named manager of Olimpia de Itá. He returned to his assistant role in the following year at Libertad, before returning to Olimpia in 2017 as manager of the reserve side.

On 3 April 2018, Almeida took over Sportivo Trinidense, but was sacked in May after only one win in eight matches. On 17 April 2019, he was named in charge of Resistencia, being relieved of his duties on 19 May.

In 2020, Almeida worked as a sports commentator before being again assistant of his father at Sol de América in 2021. On 3 May of that year, he was named interim manager after his father was sacked, but still left the club on 2 June.

Almeida returned to Olimpia in June 2021, as manager of the under-17 side. On 19 October, he replaced sacked Celso Ayala at the helm of River Plate Asunción, but left in the end of the season after suffering relegation.

On 5 July 2022, Almeida returned to the top tier after replacing Humberto Ovelar at the helm of Tacuary. On 12 October, he was himself dismissed.

Personal life
Almeida's father Ever was also a footballer and a goalkeeper. He too later became a manager.

References

External links

1974 births
Living people
Sportspeople from Asunción
Paraguayan footballers
Association football goalkeepers
Club Olimpia footballers
Sportivo Patria footballers
Paraguayan expatriate footballers
Paraguayan expatriate sportspeople in Argentina
Expatriate footballers in Argentina
Paraguayan football managers
Club Sol de América managers
Club Tacuary managers
Sportivo Trinidense managers